USCU may refer to:

U.S. Central Credit Union
University of South Carolina Union
University of South Carolina Upstate
United States customary units

See also
USC (disambiguation)